Ra's Sajir (Arabic: رأس ساجر), also transliterated as Ra's Sājir, is a  high sea cliff and headland in Dhofar, Oman.  The cliffs are located near the town of Shaat and overlook the open Arabian Sea.  This region of the Arabian Peninsula experiences a summer monsoon known as the Khareef.  This leads to Ra's Sajir's green landscape in the summer months, unusual for much the Arabian region.  Throughout history, Ra's Sajir has acted as a notable landmark for seafaring traders passing between the Red Sea and the Persian Gulf and India.

References

Headlands of Oman
Dhofar Governorate